Karl Friedrich Wunder (1849 in Hanover - 1924 id.) was a German photographer, publisher of photo books and postcards.

References

Further reading 
 Ludwig Hoerner: Hannover in frühen Photographien 1848–1910. Hannover 1979.
 Adolf Kiepert: Hannover in Wort und Bild, Text von Adolf Kiepert, hrsg. vom Verein zur Förderung des Fremdenverkehrs in Hannover, mit 286 Illustrationen nach Original-Gemälden und Original-Zeichnungen von Diekmann … sowie nach photographischen Original-Aufnahmen. (Nachdr. der Ausg.) Hanover, Kiepert, 1910, 2nd edition. Schlütersche, Hanover 1981, with numerous photographs by Karl F. Wunder

External links 

 Adam An-tAthair-Síoraí: Wunder auf der Seite De Animorum Immortalitate, Unterseiten Hannover.

German photographers
19th-century photographers
19th-century publishers (people)
20th-century publishers (people)
Postcard publishers
1849 births
1924 deaths
People from Hanover